Juan Pablo Freytes (born 11 January 2000) is an Argentine professional footballer who plays as a centre-back for Independiente Rivadavia on loan from Newell's Old Boys.

Club career
Freytes played in the academy of Newell's Old Boys, with the defender featuring for the club's youth teams including the U17s in a friendly against the United States U17s in June 2017. He was promoted to their senior squad in 2018, subsequently going unused on the substitutes bench for two Primera División matches in 2018–19. Freytes' professional debut soon arrived in an away loss to San Lorenzo on 16 February 2019.

In the summer 2021, Freytes was loaned out to Independiente Rivadavia until the end of 2022 with an option to purchase 80% of his rights, for a fee around one million dollars.

International career
Freytes received a call-up to train with the Argentina national team in August 2017, ahead of friendlies with Uruguay and Venezuela.

Career statistics
.

References

External links

2000 births
Living people
Sportspeople from Córdoba Province, Argentina
Argentine footballers
Argentine expatriate footballers
Association football defenders
Argentine Primera División players
Newell's Old Boys footballers
Independiente Rivadavia footballers
Unión La Calera footballers
Chilean Primera División players
Expatriate footballers in Chile